Claire Liu was the defending champion but chose not to participate.

Louisa Chirico won the title, defeating Wang Xiyu in the final, 6–4, 6–3.

Seeds

Draw

Finals

Top half

Bottom half

References

Main Draw

Boar's Head Resort Women's Open - Singles